Brian John Dobbin (born August 18, 1966) is a Canadian retired professional ice hockey player. He played in 63 National Hockey League (NHL) games with the Philadelphia Flyers and Boston Bruins between 1986 and 1992. The rest of his career, which lasted from 1986 to 1999, was spent in various minor leagues.

Career statistics

Regular season and playoffs

External links
 

1966 births
Living people
Austin Ice Bats players
Boston Bruins players
Canadian ice hockey right wingers
Cincinnati Cyclones (IHL) players
Grand Rapids Griffins (IHL) players
Hershey Bears players
Ice hockey people from Ontario
Kingston Canadians players
London Knights players
Maine Mariners players
Milwaukee Admirals players
Muskegon Fury players
New Haven Nighthawks players
People from Lambton County
Philadelphia Flyers draft picks
Philadelphia Flyers players
Port Huron Border Cats players